John Beverley Robinson (February 21, 1821 – June 19, 1896) was a Canadian politician, lawyer and businessman. He was mayor of Toronto and a provincial and federal member of parliament. He was the fifth Lieutenant Governor of Ontario between the years 1880–1887.

Biography
He was born in York, Upper Canada (later Toronto) in 1821, the son of Sir John Robinson, an important political figure in Upper Canada. He attended Upper Canada College, where he was a leading cricketer, eventually representing Canada in the inaugural international cricket match, against United States in 1844.

During the Upper Canada Rebellion of 1837, Robinson served as aide-de-camp to Sir Francis Bond Head. He later studied law and was called to the bar in 1844. He became an alderman in Toronto at St. Patrick's Ward during the 1850s, including a term as mayor in 1856. He was also involved in the incorporation of a number of companies in the Toronto area including the Toronto and Georgian Bay Canal Company in 1856. He was elected to the 6th Parliament of the Province of Canada representing Toronto in 1858. He helped promote the Northern Railway and served as president from 1862 to 1875. He represented Algoma in the House of Commons of Canada in 1872 and represented West Toronto in 1878. He was also a member of the Orange Order in Canada.

He briefly lived at The Grange, a house in Springfield, Toronto Township. Now Erindale, a community in Mississauga, it is home to Heritage Mississauga.

He suffered a stroke while preparing to give a speech at Massey Hall in Toronto and  died in 1896.

Family

Hon. John Beverley Robinson married Mary Jane Hagerman, daughter of Judge Christopher Alexander Hagerman and his wife Elizabeth, daughter of James Macaulay. Their daughter Minnie Caroline Robinson was born and educated in Toronto. She married, 1881, William Forsyth-Grant, Esquire, formerly Captain of H.M.'s 82nd Regiment, son of William Forsyth, Esquire, of Ecclesgreig Castle, County Kincardine, Scotland, J. P. and D.L., who, in 1842, assumed by Royal licence the additional surname of Grant (Chad-wick). her husband was grandson of John Forsyth of Montreal. She contributed to periodicals and newspapers and authored a travel book "Scenes in Hawaii, or Life in the Sandwich Islands." She served as President of the Woman's Historical Society of Toronto, and was elected President of the Ladies' Relief Society of Toronto, Ontario.

The couple's youngest daughter Augusta Louisa, sang in London at public concerts, in company with other artists, and was also on tour in the Provinces. During John Beverley Robinson's term as Lieutenant-Governor of Ontario, 1880–87, his wife Mary Jane Robinson and daughter Augusta Louise dispensed the hospitalities of Government House. She frequently sang at Government House and subsequently took vocal instruction in London, from Randegger, and in Paris, from Laborde. In London she lived with the song composer, Maude Valérie White. 
Augusta Louisa returned to Canada in 1895, and sang on tour with Emma Albani, Pol Plançon, Harry Plunket Greene, and Allan James Foley. She married, October 8, 1898, Stewart Fielde Houston, Barrister.

Electoral record

References

Sources
 Adams, P. (2010) A history of Canadian cricket, lulu.com. .

External links 

Robinson, C. W. (Charles Walker), 1836-1924. Life of Sir John Beverley Robinson, Bart., Chief-Justice of Upper Canada. With a pref. by George R. Parkin. 1904, from Internet Archive.
The Honourable John Beverley Robinson (1821–1896) at The Lieutenant Governor of Ontario
John Beverley Robinson family fonds, Archives of Ontario

1821 births
1896 deaths
Businesspeople from Toronto
Conservative Party of Canada (1867–1942) MPs
Cricketers from Ontario
Lieutenant Governors of Ontario
Members of the Legislative Assembly of the Province of Canada from Canada West
Members of the House of Commons of Canada from Ontario
Mayors of Toronto
Persons of National Historic Significance (Canada)
Sportspeople from Toronto
Treasurers of the Law Society of Upper Canada
Upper Canada College alumni